Rion Amilcar Scott is an American short story writer. He won the PEN/Robert W. Bingham Prize for his 2016 book Insurrections.

Life 
Scott was born in Washington, D.C.  and grew up in Silver Spring, Maryland. His parents are from Trinidad and came to the United States to study at Howard University. He graduated from George Mason University and teaches at The University of Maryland.

Works 
 Insurrections: Stories, Lexington, Kentucky: University Press of Kentucky, 2016. , 
The World Doesn't Require You, Liveright, 2019.

References

External links 
 

Year of birth missing (living people)
Living people
American male short story writers
American people of Trinidad and Tobago descent
Bowie State University faculty
George Mason University alumni